George W. Wolff was a member of the Wisconsin State Assembly (1895–1897) and the Wisconsin State Senate (1901–1907).

Biography
Wolff was born on April 7, 1848 in Rhine, Wisconsin. Julius Wolff, his father, was also a member of the Assembly. He attended high school in Sheboygan, Wisconsin and what is now Lawrence University. By trade, Wolff was a farmer. In addition, he was a member of the Independent Order of Odd Fellows.

In 1890, Wolff married Helen K. Bettelhauser. They had two daughters. Wolff eventually settled in Elkhart Lake, Wisconsin, where he died on April 1, 1919. He was buried in Franklin, Sheboygan County, Wisconsin.

Political career
Wolff served two terms in the Assembly before serving in the Senate from 1901 to 1909. Additionally, he was Chairman (similar to Mayor) of Rhine from 1896 to 1906 and a member of the Sheboygan County, Wisconsin Board of Supervisors from 1886 to 1906, serving as Chairman from 1895 to 1904. He was a Republican.

References

External links
Find a Grave

Politicians from Sheboygan, Wisconsin
Republican Party Wisconsin state senators
Republican Party members of the Wisconsin State Assembly
Mayors of places in Wisconsin
County supervisors in Wisconsin
Farmers from Wisconsin
Lawrence University alumni
1848 births
1919 deaths
Burials in Wisconsin
People from Elkhart Lake, Wisconsin
Members of the Odd Fellows